Joy Abraham(born 7 March 1951, Bharananganam, District Kottayam (Kerala)) is an Indian Politician and a Member of Parliament in the Rajya Sabha, Upper House of Indian Parliament. He represents Kerala State and is a member of the Kerala Congress (M) party.

He is Advocate by profession. He studied B.A at Saint Thomas College, Pala and completed his LL.B. at Law Academy of Law College at Thiruvananthapuram.

Shri Joy Abraham is a graduate of St. Thomas College, Palai where he got his B.A., LL.B. degrees.

References

1951 births
Living people
Malayali politicians
People from Kottayam district
Rajya Sabha members from Kerala
Kerala Congress (M) politicians
Kerala MLAs 1991–1996